ISOCHRON (Inner SOlar system CHRONogy) is a proposed lunar sample-return mission that would retrieve samples of the youngest lunar mare basalt. 

This robotic mission was proposed in July 2019 to NASA's Discovery Program. It was not shortlisted.

Overview

ISOCHRON would address fundamental questions about the composition of the lunar crust and the time-stratigraphy of lunar volcanic processes, with implications for all of the terrestrial planets. There is a stretch of nearly 2 billion years of lunar history that planetary scientists have not been able to date because the Apollo missions did not retrieve any young rocks. Lunar mare basalts formed through partial melting of the mantle, thus serve as probes of the structure and composition of the interior.  The stated scientific objective of the mission is: "[To] make high-precision radiometric age measurements on these relatively young basalts to fill the existing gap in age-correlated crater size-frequency distributions (CSFDs), thereby greatly improving this widely-used tool for estimating the ages of exposed surfaces on rocky bodies." 

The sample would be placed in a small container, launched to Earth, and it would be curated at NASA's Lunar Sample Laboratory Facility.

The Principal Investigator is Dave Draper, at NASA's Johnson Space Center in Texas.

Location
The sample would be obtained from the Aristarchus plateau, located in the midst of the Oceanus Procellarum, a large expanse of lunar mare. This is a tilted crustal block, about 200 km across, that rises to a maximum elevation of 2 km above the mare in the southeastern section.

See also

Geology of the Moon
Internal structure of the Moon
Relative dating

References

Discovery program proposals
Proposed space probes
Missions to the Moon
Sample return missions